Sgt Curtis Grubb Culin III (February 10, 1915 – November 20, 1963) was a World War II soldier credited with the invention of a hedge-breaching device fitted to Allied armored vehicles during the Battle of Normandy. As they moved inland after the D-Day landings, the Allies found their tanks were unable to operate easily or safely in the Normandy bocage countryside. Instead of breaking through the thick, high hedges the tanks rode over them, which exposed their thinly armored undersides to attack while their own guns could not be brought to bear.

A native of Cranford, New Jersey, Culin was serving as a tanker with the 102nd Cavalry Reconnaissance Squadron (New Jersey National Guard, the "Essex Troop," 2nd Armored Division) when he came up with the four-pronged plow device created from scrap steel from a German roadblock. When attached to the front of his tank it was successful in rapidly plowing gaps in the hedgerows. Military historian Max Hastings notes that Culin was inspired by "a Tennessee hillbilly named Roberts", who during a discussion about how the bocage could be overcome said "Why don't we get some saw teeth and put them on the front of the tank and cut through these hedges?" Rather than joining in the laughter that greeted this remark, Culin realised the idea's potential and put together a prototype tusk-like assembly welded to the front of a tank. In due course this was demonstrated to General Bradley, who "watched in awe as a hedgerow exploded ... to make way for the Sherman bursting through". According to Hastings, Culin, "an honest man", attempted to give credit to Roberts but this was forgotten in the publicity surrounding the invention. Hastings concludes: "[Culin] became a very American kind of national hero".

Bradley ordered that as many Sherman tanks as possible be fitted with the device. By the launch of Operation Cobra, some 60 percent of First Army tanks were so equipped.

Culin received the Legion of Merit.

Four months after his invention, he lost a leg to a land mine in the Huertgen Forest. When he returned to the United States, he became a salesman for Schenley Industries, Inc., liquor distributors.

Eisenhower speech
Culin was mentioned in one of the last addresses by Dwight D. Eisenhower as President of the United States, in a January 10, 1961, speech to the American Society of Mechanical Engineers:

Eisenhower repeated this story about Sergeant Culin in 1964 in a television interview with CBS correspondent Walter Cronkite on the 20th anniversary of the D-Day invasion taking place in the actual hedgerow country of France.

Personal life

Curtis G. Culin married Bernice Enright in 1945.  They lived in New York City, where he worked for Schenley Industries.  "Curtis Grubb" is a third-generation family name arising from Patriot ancestor Col. Curtis Grubb. Curtis was a member of the Sons of the American Revolution.  Culin died in Greenwich Village, Manhattan, New York in 1963.  He is buried in Westfield, New Jersey.

See also

 Operation Cobra

References

Noteworthy NCOs, NCOhistory.com  Includes a photograph of Sgt. Cullen in his entry.

'Citizen and Chronicle, Garwood, Cranford, Kenilworth, 7 Sep 1944, 'Cited for Invention''.

External links

1915 births
1963 deaths
United States Army personnel of World War II
People from Cranford, New Jersey
Recipients of the Legion of Merit
United States Army non-commissioned officers
Military personnel from New Jersey